Svaton Peaks is a cluster of rugged peaks at the north end of the Queen Elizabeth Range, surmounting the area between the mouths of the Heilman and Otago Glaciers. Mapped by the United States Geological Survey (USGS) from tellurometer surveys and Navy air photos, 1960–62. Named by the Advisory Committee on Antarctic Names (US-ACAN) for Ernest M. Svaton, United States Antarctic Research Program (USARP) ionospheric physicist at McMurdo Station, winter 1963 and 1964.

References

Mountains of the Ross Dependency
Shackleton Coast